Marco Manfredi (Freiburg, 18 September 1997) is an Italian rugby union player.
His usual position is as a Hooker and he currently plays for Zebre in Pro14. 

From 2016 to 2018 he played with Espoirs team of Montpellier Hérault. Under contract with Top10 team Calvisano, for 2017–18 Pro14 season, he named as Permit Player for Zebre in Pro 14.

In 2016, Manfredi was named in the Italy Under 20 squad. 
On the 29 January 2023, he was selected by Kieran Crowley to be part of an Italy 33-man squad for the 2023 Six Nations Championship. He made his debut against Scotland in the last match.

References

External links

Profile Player
Rugby Pass Profile
All Rugby Profile

1997 births
Living people
Italian rugby union players
Zebre Parma players
Rugby Calvisano players
Rugby union hookers
Montpellier Hérault Rugby players
Italy international rugby union players